Group Captain James Martin Stagg,  (30 June 1900 – 23 June 1975) was a Met Office meteorologist attached to the Royal Air Force during the Second World War who notably persuaded General Dwight D. Eisenhower to change the date of the Allied invasion of Europe from 5 to 6 June 1944.

Early life
Stagg was born in Musselburgh, East Lothian to Alexander C. Stagg and his wife, Helen (Ellen). He was educated at Dalkeith High School in Dalkeith until the age of 15. As Dalkeith High did not provide further education he completed his schooling at Broughton Junior Student Centre in Edinburgh.

In 1921 Stagg graduated with a Master of Arts from the University of Edinburgh and took a post as Science Master at George Heriot's School in Edinburgh.

Meteorological career
In 1924 Stagg became an assistant in the British Meteorological Office and he was appointed superintendent of Kew Observatory in 1939. In the winter of 1932/33 he led the British Polar Expedition of Arctic Canada. In 1936 he received a DSc from the University of Edinburgh with a thesis on terrestrial magnetism.

Stagg was appointed the Chief Meteorological Officer, SHAEF for Operation Overlord. In 1943 he had been commissioned a Group Captain in the Royal Air Force Volunteer Reserve to lend him the necessary authority in a military milieu unused to outsiders.

Stagg worked with three forecasting teams from the Royal Navy, Met Office and the USAAF. The detail of the D-Day forecasts is in the accounts published by participants, including Stagg himself.

D-Day weather

Planners of the Normandy landings in June 1944 allowed for the tides, the time of day, and the phase of the moon – these conditions would be satisfactory on only a few days in each month. A full moon was desirable, as it would provide illumination for aircraft pilots and have the highest tides. The landings would be shortly before dawn, mid-way between low and high tide, with the tide coming in. This would improve the visibility of obstacles on the beach, while minimising the amount of time the men would be exposed in the open. Eisenhower had tentatively selected 5 June as the date for the assault. However, on 4 June, conditions were unsuitable for a landing: high winds and heavy seas made it impossible to launch landing craft, and low clouds would prevent aircraft from finding their targets.

Stagg met Eisenhower on the evening of 4 June. He and his meteorological team predicted that the weather would improve enough for the invasion to proceed on 6 June. The next available dates with the required tidal conditions (but without the desirable full moon) would be two weeks later, from 18 to 20 June. Postponement of the invasion would have required recalling men and ships already in position to cross the Channel, and would have increased the chance that the invasion plans would be detected. After much discussion with the other senior commanders, Eisenhower decided that the invasion should go ahead on the 6th. A major storm battered the Normandy coast from 19 to 22 June, which would have made the beach landings impossible.

Allied control of the Atlantic gave Allied meteorologists an advantage in the North Atlantic weather war for storm prediction. As the Luftwaffe meteorological centre in Paris was predicting two weeks of stormy weather, many Wehrmacht commanders left their posts to attend war games in Rennes, and men in many units were given leave. German Commander Field Marshal Erwin Rommel returned to Germany for his wife's birthday and to meet with Hitler to try to obtain more Panzers.

For his invaluable services over the D-Day period, Stagg was appointed an Officer of the US Legion of Merit in 1945 and was also appointed Officer of the Order of the British Empire (OBE) at the same time.

Later life
Stagg later worked as director of services at the Meteorological Office until 1960.

Stagg was appointed Companion of the Order of the Bath (CB) in the 1954 New Year Honours. He was elected as a Fellow of the Royal Society of Edinburgh in 1951. His proposers were Edmund Dymond, James Paton, C. T. R. Wilson and Robert Schlapp. In 1959 he was elected President of the Royal Meteorological Society.

Stagg died in 1975 and was buried in Dalkeith Cemetery. On 6 June 2019, 75 years to the day since D-Day, he had a plaque unveiled to him in his hometown of Dalkeith. Achieved through crowdfunding, the plaque was unveiled by his son, Peter Kidner Stagg.

Stagg was portrayed by Patrick Barr in the 1962 film The Longest Day, Christopher James Baker in the 2004 TV movie Ike: Countdown to D-Day, David Haig in his own 2014 play Pressure, and Steven Cree in 2017's Churchill.

Family
In 1940, Stagg married Elizabeth Nancy Kidner. They had two sons: Scotland rugby player Peter Kidner Stagg (born 1941); and Alexander Martin Stagg (born 1944).

See also
 Weather forecasting for Operation Overlord 
 Military meteorology
 Donald Norton Yates

Citations

Bibliography

Further reading
 
 
 
  (Rehnquist served as a USAAF weather observer in World War II.)
 

1900 births
1975 deaths
Scottish military personnel
British meteorologists
Companions of the Order of the Bath
Fellows of the Royal Society of Edinburgh
Officers of the Order of the British Empire
Presidents of the Royal Meteorological Society
Royal Air Force group captains
Royal Air Force Volunteer Reserve personnel of World War II
People educated at Dalkeith High School
20th-century British scientists
Scottish meteorologists
People from Musselburgh